The Zotye E200 was an all-electric car that is manufactured by the Chinese manufacturer Zotye.

Overview

The Zotye E200 was unveiled during the 2015 Shanghai Auto Show in China with prices stated to be 69,900 yuan. 

The E200 electric city car is powered by an electric motor producing 82hp and 170nm of torque.  According to Zotye, the Zotye E200 has a top speed of 150 kilometer per hour with a maximum range of 220 kilometers. The E200 is available with a choice of two batteries; 24.5kWh or 31.9 kWh.

References

External links

Production electric cars
2010s cars
E200
Cars introduced in 2015
Cars of China